Narayan Chandra Chanda (born 12 March 1945) is a Bangladesh Awami League politician, the incumbent Jatiya Sangsad member from the Khulna-5 constituency since 2009, and a former Minister of Fisheries and Livestock.

Early life 
Chanda was born on 12 March 1945 in Dumuria upazila of Khulna district.

Family 
Chanda's son, Abhijit Chandra Chanda, died in January 2020 after committing suicide.

Career 
Chanda was elected chairman of Bhandarpara Union Parishad of Dumuria upazila in the first union council election of Bangladesh. He had been elected Chairman for six consecutive times.  He was elected a Member of Parliament in the Dumuria-Fultala (Khulna-5) constituency in the by-elections held on December 27, 2000 after the death of the then Health Minister Salahuddin Yusuf. Chanda, a hard working, dedicated activist for the party, was again elected a Member of Parliament in the ninth parliamentary election of 2008. He was elected unopposed for the third time in the 10th parliamentary election in 2014. He got the office of State Minister of Fisheries and Live stocks in this term and later in 2018 he was preceded by Mohammad Sayedul Haque and got the office of Ministry of Fisheries and live stocks.

References

Living people
1945 births
Awami League politicians
Bangladeshi Hindus
State Ministers of Fisheries and Livestock
Fisheries and Livestock ministers of Bangladesh
7th Jatiya Sangsad members
9th Jatiya Sangsad members
10th Jatiya Sangsad members
11th Jatiya Sangsad members